Lough Forbes is a lake and Special Area of Conservation in Ireland, located west of Newtownforbes.

See also 
 List of loughs in Ireland

References 

Lakes of County Longford
Lakes of County Roscommon